Robert Smellie (22 December 1867 – 14 October 1951) was a Scottish footballer who played for Hamilton Academical, Queen's Park, Motherwell, St Bernard's, Corinthian and Scotland, as a left back. He was a Scottish Cup winner with Queen's Park in 1890 and 1893. He was later the Queen's Park club president; away from football he was an auctioneer in the farming industry, working in a family business which continued into the 21st century.

His career has sometimes erroneously included details of another player of the same name who played in the same position for Annbank, Sunderland  and Walsall Town Swifts in the mid-1890s, based on the assumption that as an amateur he was able to move fairly freely between different clubs. However, that did not apply to professional English Football League clubs, and evidence such as both men playing matches for different clubs on the same day shows them to be separate people.

See also
List of Scotland national football team captains

References

Sources

External links

Scotland profile, London Hearts Supporters Club

1867 births
1951 deaths
Footballers from Hamilton, South Lanarkshire
Scottish footballers
Scotland international footballers
Hamilton Academical F.C. players
Corinthian F.C. players
Queen's Park F.C. players
Scottish Football League players
Motherwell F.C. players
St Bernard's F.C. players
Association football fullbacks
Chairmen and investors of football clubs in Scotland